Tata Neu is a multi-purpose super-app, developed in India by the Tata Group. It is the country's first super-app. The app was launched on 7 April 2022 by Natarajan Chandrasekaran, chairman of Tata Sons, coinciding with the start of an Indian Premier League match. It is an official sponsor of the 2022 IPL, as the tournament's primary title sponsor itself is the Tata Group. The app provides delivery services, online shopping, UPI payments, flight and hotel bookings, among others. Many brands and companies like Bigbasket, AirIndia, Air Asia, Cromā, IHCL, Starbucks, Tata 1Mg, Tata CLiQ, Tata Play, and Westside are a part of this app.

History

Struggled Launch (2022- Present) 
Tata Group in early 2022 began shifting to the E-Commerce play with the Tata Digital platform. The company made high profile investments and acquisitions in BigBasket, 1mg and many other companies. These acquisitions and all other digital platforms operated by Tata such as Croma, Tata Cliq and others were shifted to the Tata Digital platform as part of the companies' consolidation plans. These acquisitions and investments soon paved the way for the creation of Tata Neu a super app. The brands under Tata Digital and others such as Airline booking, DTH through TataPlay were all brought into the Tata Neu. 

Tata Neu was launched in April 7, 2022 with many anticipations. Days leading up to the launch, the app was marketed heavily during Tata IPL 2022 edition. During the launch day, the servers were overloaded and were unable to handle the high influx of customers. In its first month of operations since launching the app, Tata Neu has clocked gross sales in the range $120-$150 million. However, the sales numbers missed the 200 million dollars targets set by Tata Digital. Reports stated that Tata Digital received as much as 2 billion US Dollars in funding from Tata Group for the Tata Nue app and additional investments. By May ending the app had nearly 11 million downloads, however the app was bugged with constant glitches and slow response time leading to a reduction in customer usage. 

As the reports of high number of bugs and sluggish user experienced continued, reports emerged that Tata Nue CTO had resigned within 4 months and the app faced backlash over data sharing of customer info between companies.  In January 2023 Mukesh bansal the President of Tata Digital and head of Operations for Tata Neu stepped down from Tata Nue with Pratik Pal, the CEO of Tata Digital, looking after all the business decisions at the firm. Soon, additional reports emerged that Tata Neu is set to miss the first year GMV by as much as 50%. Internal projections showed the company projecting GMV by March 2023 at 4 billion dollars vs expected 8 billion dollars (which was scaled down from 10 billion dollars).

App Features 

As of January 2023 the App offers the following features:- 

 Grocery and Instant Grocery through BigBasket
 Mobiles, Electronics, TV and Appliances through Croma
 Medicines, Lab Tests, Health Products through Tata 1mg
 Fashion, Footwear through Westside and Tata Cliq
 Hotels through IHCL
 Luxury through Tata Cliq Luxury
 Flights through AIX Connect
 Entertainment through Tata Play
 Eat and Drink through Starbucks India 
 Watches, Jewellery through Titan
The company also has plans to further intergrate Vistara, Air India, Titan, Tanishq, and Tata Motors into the app.

For all purchases made through the app customers will receive 5% neucoins (5 for every 100 rupees spent) which can be redeemed at other services in the app, (one 'NeuCoin' is equivalent to ₹1). The app also offer financial services such as credit score, loans, gold investment and operates Tata Pay the UPI arm of the group. A 'NeuPass' can also be purchased, which will give discounts and offers.

References 

E-commerce in India
Mobile payments in India
Indian brands
Online payments
Payment service providers
Super-apps
Mobile payments